Harcourt-Vernon is a surname: 
Granville Harcourt-Vernon (1792–1879), British politician
Granville Harcourt-Vernon (1816–1861), British politician

See also
Vernon-Harcourt
Venables-Vernon-Harcourt
Harcourt (surname)
Vernon family

Compound surnames
Surnames of English origin
Surnames of Norman origin